In Chile, the O'Higgins Pioche is a piece regarded as the true symbol of presidential power, which is placed in the lower end of the presidential sash of office. The O'Higgins Pioche is a five-pointed star of about 7 cm in diameter, enameled in red.

This was the name given to a medal that Bernardo O'Higgins ordered to be put on the presidential sash. The relic was a gift by O'Higgins to José Gregorio Argomedo (1767–1830) after his abdication on January 1823. During the inauguration of the monument in the Alameda (1872), descendants of Argomedo gave it to President Federico Errázuriz Zañartu, who put it on the presidential sash in inaugurating a tradition that continues.

The original piocha remained intact until the 1973 coup, when it disappeared during the bombing of La Moneda Palace. During the military regime, a replica was made in the base of photographs of the original. The piocha is only to be used in conjunction with the presidential sash.

The "Pioche de O'Higgins" is the element that symbolizes the transfer of power from one president to the next one during the ceremony of change of command.

See also 
 Bernardo O'Higgins
 History of Chile
 Presidential sash

References 

Heads of state of Chile
Political history of Chile